The 2012–2013 Vendée Globe is a non-stop solo Round the World Yacht Race for IMOCA 60 class yachts this is the seventh edition of the race.

Summary
The 2012 Vendée Globe started on 10 November 2012. The race saw the 24-hour singlehanded distance record repeatedly reset by several competitors. Armel Le Cléac’h (Banque Populaire) set a new race record for shortest time to the longitude of the Cape of Good Hope, and François Gabart (Macif) set new race records for shortest time to the longitude of Cape Leeuwin in Australia and to Cape Horn. On 27 January 2013, Gabart set a new Vendée Globe record with just over 78 days to complete the circumnavigation. The interval of 3h 17’ between the arrivals of the first and second contenders is also the shortest in the race's history.

Race Director for this edition was Denis Horeau who heads the event management team having done the role for the 1989, 2004 and 2008 editions.

Incidents

Other incidents
Jean Piere Dick finished the Vendee Globe without the keel attached as a remarkable piece of seamanship meant he sailed the final 2650 nautical miles. With Alex Thomson altering course to escort him during worsening conditions.

Retirement causes

Results

Finishing time

(1) 12h time penalty for unsealing and using emergency water supply

Stage times

Gallery

Competitor

Gallery of sailors

List of participant and equipment used

References

External links
 Official Website
 Official YouTube Channel
 Official Facebook Page

Vendée Globe
Vendée Globe
Vendée Globe
Vendée Globe
Vendée Globe